Lajpat Bhawan is an auditorium in Kanpur situated in Ashok Nagar-Motijheel. It generally host now different programme or functions such as marriages, annual days of school, poet collaboration, etc. .It is Managed by Kanpur Nagar Nigam.

Theatres in India
Buildings and structures in Kanpur
Memorials to Lala Lajpat Rai